St Scholastica's College (commonly referred to as Schols) is an independent Roman Catholic single-sex secondary day and boarding school for girls, located in Glebe Point, in Sydney, New South Wales, Australia.

Established in 1878 by the Sisters of the Good Samaritan, the College provides education for girls from the Sydney region, and as of 2019 had approximately 1,030 students from Year 7 to Year 12, including 80 boarders from international, remote and urban areas. St Scholastica's is located within the Archdiocese of Sydney and is affiliated with the Australian Boarding Schools' Association (ABSA).

Sporting 
The College sports program includes touch football, volleyball, rowing, tennis, soccer, netball and dragon boating. They participate in the Catholic Girls Schools Secondary Sports Association (CGSSSA) competitions and in local competitions on weekends.

Houses 
As of 2018 the College operates with seven houses named after notable Catholic women: Hart (the red house), Clarke (the orange house), Adamson (the yellow house), Ronayne (the green house), McLaughlin (the blue house), Gibbons (the purple house) and Byrne (the pink house).  The College homerooms are also organised by house.

Each year the house with the most points wins the House Spirit Cup.  House points are awarded to students for swimming and athletic carnival participation and spirit, for participation in a vast range of extra-curricular and co-curricular activities, and for gaining awards.

Notable alumni 
Basia A'Hern – actress
Jennifer Anne Alexander – Chief Executive Officer of the Australian Institute of Management, New South Wales and the Australian Capital Territory; Chairman of Gondwana Voices (also attended Rosebank College)
Mabel Eileen Furley  – Member of the NSW Legislative Council (1962–64); Foundation member of the Liberal Party; Chairman of the Federal Women's Committee of the Liberal Party of Australia
 Malarndirri (Barbara) McCarthy – an Australian politician who represented Arnhem in the Northern Territory Legislative Assembly from 2005 to 2012. School captain in 1988.

See also 

 List of Catholic schools in New South Wales
 Catholic education in Australia
 List of boarding schools in Australia
 Toxteth Park, Glebe

References

External links
 St Scholastica's College website

Educational institutions established in 1878
1878 establishments in Australia
Boarding schools in New South Wales
Catholic secondary schools in Sydney
Girls' schools in New South Wales
Catholic boarding schools in Australia
Glebe, New South Wales
Alliance of Girls' Schools Australasia
Roman Catholic Archdiocese of Sydney